Macon County is a county located in the east central part of the U.S. state of Alabama. As of the 2020 census, the population was 19,532. Its county seat is Tuskegee. Its name is in honor of Nathaniel Macon, a member of the United States Senate from North Carolina.

Developed for cotton plantation agriculture in the nineteenth century, the county is considered within the Black Belt of the South. It has had a majority-black population since before the American Civil War.

History
For thousands of years, this area was inhabited by varying cultures of indigenous peoples. The historic tribes encountered by European explorers were the Creek people, descendants of the Mississippian culture.

Macon County was established by European Americans on December 18, 1832, from land ceded by the Creek, following the US Congress' passage of the Indian Removal Act of 1830. The Creek were removed to Indian Territory west of the Mississippi River. The new settlers brought slaves with them from eastern areas of the South or purchased them at the slave market in Montgomery, New Orleans or Mobile. They developed the county for large cotton plantations.

In the first half of the twentieth century, thousands of African-Americans migrated out of the county to industrial cities in the North and Midwest for job opportunities, and the chance to escape legal segregation. Those who remained have struggled for employment in the mostly rural county, and population has declined by about one-third since 1950.

Before 1983, Macon County was primarily known as the home of historic Tuskegee Institute, now Tuskegee University, and its noted founder and first president, Dr. Booker T. Washington.

Geography

Major highways
 Interstate 85
 U.S. Highway 29
 U.S. Highway 80
 State Route 14
 State Route 49
 State Route 81
 State Route 138
 State Route 186
 State Route 199
 State Route 229

Adjacent counties
Tallapoosa County (north)
Lee County (northeast)
Russell County (southeast)
Bullock County (south)
Montgomery County (southwest)
Elmore County (northwest)

National protected areas
 Tuskegee Airmen National Historic Site
 Tuskegee Institute National Historic Site
 The George Washington Carver Museum
 Tuskegee National Forest

Railroads
CSX A&WP Subdivision
 Former Seaboard Line (abandoned)

Demographics

2020 census

As of the 2020 United States census, there were 19,532 people, 7,474 households, and 4,279 families residing in the county.

2010 census
As of the 2010 United States census, there were 21,452 people living in the county. 82.6% were Black or African American, 15.5% White, 0.4% Asian, 0.1% Native American, 0.3% of some other race and 1.1% of two or more races. 1.1% were Hispanic or Latino (of any race).

2000 census
As of the census of 2000, there were 24,105 people, 8,950 households, and 5,543 families living in the county. The population density was 40 people per square mile (15/km2). There were 10,627 housing units at an average density of 17 per square mile (7/km2). The racial makeup of the county was 84.64% Black or African American, 13.96% White, 0.16% Native American, 0.38% Asian, 0.13% from other races, and 0.73% from two or more races. 0.72% of the population were Hispanic or Latino of any race.

There were 8,950 households, out of which 28.40% had children under the age of 18 living with them, 31.70% were married couples living together, 25.80% had a female householder with no husband present, and 38.10% were non-families. 33.00% of all households were made up of individuals, and 11.90% had someone living alone who was 65 years of age or older. The average household size was 2.44 and the average family size was 3.13.

In the county, the population was spread out, with 25.20% under the age of 18, 16.90% from 18 to 24, 22.90% from 25 to 44, 21.00% from 45 to 64, and 14.00% who were 65 years of age or older. The median age was 32 years. For every 100 females there were 85.00 males. For every 100 females age 18 and over, there were 80.30 males.

The median income for a household in the county was $21,180, and the median income for a family was $28,511. Males had a median income of $25,971 versus $21,773 for females. The per capita income for the county was $13,714. About 26.80% of families and 32.80% of the population were below the poverty line, including 43.80% of those under age 18 and 26.00% of those age 65 or over.

Government
Macon County has been overwhelmingly Democratic for most of the past century and a quarter. Apart from the "dealignment" era between 1948 and 1972, and Herbert Hoover in the highly controversial 1928 election, no Republican has won so much as twenty percent of the county's vote in the past century. No Republican has obtained a majority in that time span, although Dwight D. Eisenhower won a narrow plurality in 1956.

In the elections of 1980, Macon was the most Democratic county in the nation while in 1984 it was the most Democratic outside of the District of Columbia. Macon County was only 0.02 percent shy of this in 1992, when it gave both George H. W. Bush his smallest proportion outside of the District of Columbia and independent Ross Perot his smallest vote share in any county nationwide.

The Sheriff of Macon County is Andre Brunson, who also was the former strength coach at Tuskegee University.

Communities

City
Tuskegee (county seat)

Towns
Franklin
Notasulga (partly in Lee County)
Shorter

Unincorporated communities
Boromville
Creek Stand
Cross Keys
Fort Davis
Hardaway
Little Texas
Milstead
Society Hill
Warriorstand

Places of interest
Macon County is home to the Tuskegee University, a historically black college; Tuskegee National Forest, Tuskegee Lake, the Tuskegee Human and Civil Rights Museum, and Moton Field, the training site of the Tuskegee Airmen.

See also
National Register of Historic Places listings in Macon County, Alabama
Properties on the Alabama Register of Landmarks and Heritage in Macon County, Alabama

References

 

 
1832 establishments in Alabama
Populated places established in 1832
Black Belt (U.S. region)
Counties of Appalachia
Majority-minority counties in Alabama